Dipodium elegantulum, commonly known as the elegant hyacinth orchid, is a leafless orchid that is endemic to Queensland. In spring and summer it has up to sixty pale to dark pink flowers with a few darker spots and streaks near the tips, on a tall flowering stem.

Description
Dipodium elegantulum is a tuberous, perennial, saprophytic herb.

Taxonomy and naming
Dipodium atropurpureum was first formally described in 1991 by David Jones and the description was published in Australian Orchid Research from a specimen collected near Mareeba. The specific epithet (elegantulum) is a Latin word meaning "very fine", referring to the flowers of this orchid.

Distribution and habitat
The elegant hyacinth orchid is widespread in forest and grassy woodland between the Mount Windsor Tableland, the Hervey Range and Charters Towers.

References

Orchids of Queensland
Endemic orchids of Australia
elegantulum
Plants described in 1991